was a Japanese jurist, educator and politician. He served as finance minister of Japan three times and was the founder of Josai University.

Early life and education
Mizuta was born in 1905 in Kamogawa, Chiba Prefecture. He held a law degree from Kyoto Imperial University.

Career
Mizuta was elected to the House of Representatives in 1946 after World War II. He was a member of the Liberal Democratic Party (LDP). He was the minister of trade and industry from 23 December 1956 to 10 July 1957.

He served as the minister of finance for three terms. He was first appointed to the post on 19 July 1960 and was in office until 18 July 1962. During this period Japan suffered a financial crisis running a deficit of $700m in July 1961. It fell on Mizuta to successfully negotiate short term loans with three American banks. Despite his nerves he chain-smoked his way to a successful outcome using Japan's underlying financial strength as security.

Mizuta was the chair of the LDP policy research committee from July 1966 to December 1966 when he was again appointed finance minister. His second ministerial term lasted until 30 November 1968. From 12 January 1970 to 5 July 1971 he was again the chair of the LDP policy research committee. His third term as finance minister was between 5 July 1971 and 7 July 1972. From 25 November 1973 to 11 November 1974 Mizuta served again as the chair of the LDP policy research committee. Mizuta also as Special Envoy to attend Spanish Generalissimo Francisco Franco's Funeral.

He founded Josai University in 1965. He was the chancellor and president of it and the house member until his death on 22 December 1976.

Legacy
The house where Mizuta was born in Kamogawa is a nationally registered asset and a public museum run by Josai University.

References

External links

|-

|-

|-

|-

|-

|-

|-

 

20th-century Japanese politicians
1905 births
1976 deaths
Government ministers of Japan
Japanese jurists
Kyoto University alumni
Liberal Democratic Party (Japan) politicians
Members of the House of Representatives (Japan)
Ministers of Finance of Japan
People from Kamogawa, Chiba
Politicians from Chiba Prefecture
Presidents of universities and colleges in Japan
University and college founders